Pseudotephritis corticalis is a species of picture-winged fly in the genus Pseudotephritis of the family Ulidiidae

Distribution
Germany, Denmark, Norway, and northwest Russia.

References

Ulidiidae
Insects described in 1873
Diptera of Europe
Taxa named by Hermann Loew